Derbyshire Constabulary is the territorial police force responsible for policing the county of Derbyshire, England.

Organisation and structure

To police the county the force is divided into two territorial divisions, based respectively in the towns of Buxton and Chesterfield (North Division - covering High Peak and Derbyshire Dales District Council areas, Chesterfield, NE Derbyshire,  Amber Valley and Bolsover and the villages of South Normanton and Pinxton which lie within the boundaries of Bolsover District Council), and Derby ( South Division - policing the city of Derby and the districts of Erewash, Long Eaton and South Derbyshire). The Force Headquarters, near Ripley and close to the A38 road, is Butterley Hall, former residence of Benjamin Outram and once owned by the Butterley Company.

The Old Hall and later additional buildings in the large grounds house much of the force's central administrative services. The Ops Divisions HQ at Wyatts Way Ripley (adjacent to force Headquarters) is now the home of Operational Support Division which encompasses the Road Policing Unit (with bases at Cotton Lane in Derby, Beetwell Street in Chesterfield and Chapel-en-le-Frith), ARU (Armed Response Unit), Dog Section, Uniform Task Force and Road Policing Support (Collision Investigators).  

The Constabulary is led by the chief constable assisted by a Deputy and two assistant chief constables. Each division is headed by a chief superintendent - the divisional commander - and each division is divided into Sections, which are led by an inspector.  The force has an authorised establishment of  1,827 police officers, 350 special constables and 104 Police Community Support Officers (PCSOs)

The chief officers of the force formerly worked in partnership with the 17 publicly elected representatives on the Derbyshire Police Authority, which shared responsibility for budgets and policy, and was intended to ensure that the public of Derbyshire had a voice in the policing of their county. 
Since the introduction of the Police Reform and Social Responsibility Act 2011 the Derbyshire Police and Crime Commissioner (PCC) is now responsible for tasks that were once completed by the Police Authority. In November 2012, Alan Charles was elected as PCC for a four-year term. Charles previously served as Vice Chair of the Derbyshire Police Authority.

PEEL inspection
His Majesty's Inspectorate of Constabulary and Fire & Rescue Services (HMICFRS) conducts a periodic police effectiveness, efficiency and legitimacy (PEEL) inspection of each police service's performance. In its latest PEEL inspection, Derbyshire Constabulary was rated as follows:

Geography and demographics

Derbyshire Constabulary polices an area which ranges from remote rural locations to busy city-centre and suburban environments.  The more urbanised east and south of the county, including the market town of Chesterfield and the city of Derby, generally require more officers to respond to the needs of the large resident population, while the more rural north and west require the smaller number of officers to be more mobile.  Calls for service in the rural areas usually increase during summer as the population is boosted by approximately twenty million visitors each year to the Peak District and its surrounds.  Winter weather on the unforgiving high ground around Glossop and Kinder Scout can also cause problems for traffic and residents.

Regionalisation
Proposals were made by the Home Secretary on 20 March 2006 to integrate groups of police forces in England and Wales into 'strategic' forces, which he saw as being more 'fit for purpose' in terms of combating terrorism and organised crime.  Under these proposals Derbyshire would have merged with nearby forces to create an 'East Midlands Police'. However, these proposals were unpopular and were later cancelled.

History

In 1965, the force had an establishment of 852 and an actual strength of 775.

Chief Constables 
 1873unknown: Francis Joseph Parry
 18761898: Lieutenant-Colonel William Addis Delacombe
1898unknown: Capt. Henry Mansfield Haywood
 1918c.1927: Major Philip Francis Ross Anley
 19541967: William Ewart Pitts
 19671979: Sir Walter Stansfield (knighted 1979 New Year Honours)
 19791981: James Fryer
 19811985: Alfred Parrish
 19851990: Alan Smith
 19902000: John Newing
 20012007: David Coleman
 20072017: Mick Creedon
 20172020: Peter Goodman
 2020present: Rachel Swann

Officers killed in the line of duty

The Police Roll of Honour Trust and Police Memorial Trust list and commemorate all British police officers killed in the line of duty. Since its establishment in 1984, the Police Memorial Trust has erected 50 memorials nationally to some of those officers. 

Since 1828 the following officers of Derbyshire Constabulary were killed while attempting to prevent or stop a crime in progress:
 Parish constable William Taylor, 1828 (fatally injured arresting two men)
 Police constable Joseph Moss, 1879 (shot whilst dealing with a prisoner)
 Police constable Stevenson, 2013 (collapsed and died while on duty)

See also

Law enforcement in the United Kingdom
 List of law enforcement agencies in the United Kingdom, Crown Dependencies and British Overseas Territories
North Midlands Helicopter Support Unit (now defunct)
Murder of Barbara Mayo, infamous unsolved murder of a woman in 1970 which Derbyshire Constabulary was responsible for investigating

References

External links

 Derbyshire at HMICFRS

Constabulary
Police forces of England
1967 establishments in England
Government agencies established in 1967